ABC Braga is a professional Handball team based in Braga, Portugal. It plays in LPA. It was founded on December 29, 1933. Despite the practice of handball as a primary sport, the club plays on other sports such as roller hockey, basketball, athletics, volleyball, chess, skating, and Taekwondo. It is the third most club with trophies in Andebol 1 behind the Porto e Sporting.  It is the sole Portuguese club to have played in an EHF Champions League final, which happened in the season 1993-1994. Furthermore, it is considered the best Portuguese team and one of the best at the European level.

Honours

European record

Team

Current squad 2016-2017  

Goalkeepers 
  Humberto Gomes
  Emanuel Ribeiro
  Cláudio Silva
Wingers
  Dário Andrade
  Diogo Branquinho
  Carlos Martins
  Miguel Pereira
  Carlos Bandeira
Line players
  José Costa
  João Pedro Gonçalves
  Ricardo Pesqueira

Back players
LB
  Hugo Rocha
  André Gomes
  Nuno Pereira
CB
  Tomás Albuquerque
  Pedro Marques
  Gonçalo Areias
RB
  Pedro Spínola

References

Portuguese handball clubs
Sport in Braga